Craig Andrew Lowndes  (born 21 June 1974) is an Australian racing driver in the Repco Supercars Championship competing in the Holden ZB Commodore for Triple Eight Race Engineering. He is also a TV commentator. 

Lowndes is a three-time V8 Supercar champion, a five-time Barry Sheene Medalist, and a seven-time winner of Australia's most prestigious motor race, the Bathurst 1000 and two-time winner of the Bathurst 12 Hour.

On 6 July 2018, Lowndes announced his intention to step down from full-time driving at the end of the 2018 season, continuing as a co-driver.

Among all his other achievements, Lowndes has claimed nine 500 kilometre V8 Supercar/ATCC endurance titles (six Sandown 500 victories, two Phillip Island 500 crowns and one Queensland 500 win). He is also the first driver in ATCC/V8SC history to win 100 races and holds the record for the most Bathurst 1000 podiums with 14.

On 11 June 2012, Lowndes received the Medal of the Order of Australia in the Queen's Birthday Honours List for his success in motorsport and contribution to the broader Australian community, "particularly through road safety education programs and charitable organisations."

In 2018 Lowndes was also recognised in the prestigious Australian Institute of Sport Performance Awards, as the ABC Sports Personality of the Year. On 16 March 2019, Lowndes was inducted into the Australian Motor Sport Hall of Fame.

Racing career
Lowndes began his racing career at age nine, driving go-karts at a track in the town of Whittlesea.

Early career
He moved up to race cars in 1991, driving a Van Diemen in the Motorcraft Formula Ford "Driver to Europe" Series. Despite the car being several years old and receiving minimal sponsorship, Lowndes shot to almost immediate success. Lowndes won the Australian Formula Ford Championship in 1993 which qualified him for the Formula Ford Festival in England that same year, where he finished third. Lowndes moved up to Australia's top rank of open wheel racing being Formula Brabham in 1994. His success in Formula Brabham driving an ageing Cheetah Mk9 against much more modern cars was rewarded with the Australian Silver Star.

Holden Racing Team
By this time Lowndes had been added to the Holden Racing Teams testing crew. He looked sufficiently promising in testing that Lowndes was drafted into the No. 015 Commodore with Brad Jones for the 1994 Sandown 500. It was expected to be a one-off performance as Rickard Rydell from the BTCC Volvo sister team within TWR was to join the team for Bathurst. Rydell was forced to stay home for family reasons and after his impressive debut at Sandown, HRT team manager Jeff Grech had no hesitation in giving Rydell's seat to the young Lowndes.

After a gruelling double-stint by Jones, Lowndes began the final stint of the race as the premier challenger to the DJR Falcon of John Bowe which had dominated the race. With eleven laps to go Lowndes stunned the touring car establishment overtaking Bowe on the outside of Griffins Bend in a move that made him a household name. Bowe retook a lap later and Lowndes was forced to back off in the closing laps but second was an impressive achievement for a rookie driver. Lowndes won fans in pit lane when he later admitted that his passing move on Bowe was simply a case of missing his brake marker.

A year later Lowndes qualified on pole for the Bathurst 1000, only for his Holden Racing Team Commodore to DNF early on in the race when both HRT cars experienced oil pressure problems and engine failure during the race. HRT had seen enough however, and for the 1996 season he replaced Tomas Mezera full-time in the team. At his first attempt, Lowndes won the championship and also won both the Sandown and Bathurst races with teammate Greg Murphy. His Bathurst 1000 victory made him the youngest winner of the race at the time and with Murphy, the youngest ever driver pairing to win the Bathurst 1000.

Formula 3000
Lowndes left Australia and went to Europe to further his open wheeler racing career, by competing with the RSM Marko Team in the 1997 International Formula 3000 Championship as teammate to Colombian Juan Pablo Montoya. He was comprehensively beaten by his teammate, which resulted in his failure to find a budget to compete a second year.

Australian return
On his return to Australia, Lowndes again won the 1997 Sandown 500 for HRT, partnered by New Zealander Greg Murphy. Together with back to back race wins at Sandown in the enduros. In 1998, he resumed his racing seat with the Holden Racing Team, alongside new teammate Mark Skaife. Lowndes went on to win his second consecutive Championship, although the premature debut of the VT series Commodore would cruel his Bathurst campaign.

In the first full year of campaigning the VT Commodore, Lowndes had already amassed a large lead by the time the series arrived for Round 8 at Calder Park Raceway. Following a win in the first sprint race, a poor start by Lowndes saw him bogged down in the field and subsequently tapped by another car which resulted in a spectacular roll over, momentarily sending the car airborne, into an embankment. The car (which was only 4 races old) was declared a write-off and Lowndes was fortunate to only suffer a knee injury. Despite missing the following round at Symmons Plains Raceway due to the injury, Lowndes still went on to clinch the Championship at the Bathurst Classic finishing second in the final round of the season.

Despite Lowndes being favourite to win a 4th title in 2000, he struggled with reliability and consistency throughout the season and finished 3rd in the championship, behind teammate Mark Skaife and Garth Tander, with three round wins including the Queensland 500.

Ford
Dissatisfaction within HRT triggered Lowndes move to a new team, causing a stir among race fans when he jumped ship from Holden to arch-rival manufacturer Ford, signing with a team headed up by former driver Fred Gibson. This partnership lasted for two years in which time Lowndes finished 7th and 11th in the championship. The relationship proved unsuccessful due to reliability issues with the Ford Falcon race car. Despite the setbacks, Lowndes garnered an admiration from fans for his positive attitude and demeanour. Gibson Motor Sport was renamed to 00 Motorsport (pronounced "double-o", being Lowndes' racing number) after a change of management. Lowndes's black and silver Falcon was affectionately referred to as the "green-eyed monster" for the bright green covers over the headlights.

Ford Performance Racing
Lowndes signed with the factory-sponsored Ford Performance Racing team for the 2003 season. The season saw Lowndes improve from the previous 2 seasons and managed a 5th place in the championship including his first round win since the Queensland 500 in 2000 and the first with Ford. The season proved inconsistent and reliability issues started setting in throughout the season causing Lowndes to miss out on a chance for the title. 2004 would be Lowndes worst championship year, reliability became a big issue in the FPR garage throughout the season. Lowndes finished 20th in the championship, causing him to leave the team at the end of 2004.

Triple Eight Race Engineering
Lowndes joined Triple Eight Race Engineering in 2005 and enjoyed his most successful season since switching to Ford. He had the most round victories and the most pole positions of any driver in the championship, and finished second in the final standings behind champion Russell Ingall. At the Bathurst 1000 that year, after qualifying on the pole, he spent much time in the pits after two separate incidents which severely damaged his Falcon including a wheel that smashed into his windscreen.

At the V8 Gala Awards, Lowndes was awarded the Barry Sheene Medal, an award akin to Most Valuable Player which is voted on by a team of panellists from the Australian media, motorsport magazines, television commentators and former drivers. This award was first introduced in 2003, in honour of the late Barry Sheene.

2006–8

Lowndes was a contender for the championship right up until the last race, being level on points with Rick Kelly. The two fought one of the closest non-staged finishes in Bathurst 1000 history on 8 October 2006, with Lowndes winning over Kelly by just half a second. It was his first Bathurst win since 1996 and Ford's first since 1998. The win was a very emotional one for Lowndes, being the first Bathurst 1000 held since the death of his long-time mentor Peter Brock at a road rally the month before. As winners of the Bathurst 1000, the inaugural Peter Brock Trophy was presented to Lowndes and his teammate, Jamie Whincup.

Lowndes eventually finished second in the 2006 V8 Supercar season. After complaining of having been "unfairly" held up for up to six seconds a lap by Rick Kelly's teammates over the first two races, Lowndes was level on championship points with Kelly after race 2 (of 3) in the final round. In the deciding race Kelly crashed into Lowndes heading into the hairpin resulting in a lengthy pit stop to repair Lowndes' vehicle. Kelly received a drive-through penalty and went on to finish the race in 18th position and seal the championship victory, while Lowndes finished the race 31st.

Lowndes and Triple Eight Racing lodged a protest and a hearing was set up. The protest was dismissed after a long hearing and Rick Kelly was confirmed as the 2006 champion. Lowndes and Triple Eight Racing decided not to appeal that decision and proclaim themselves the "Moral Champions" for the 2006 season. Lowndes won the Barry Sheene Medal for the second year in a row.

Lowndes had three victories in 2007, the sixth round at Hidden Valley Raceway, and both the endurance races: the Sandown 500 and the Bathurst 1000. He finished third place in the championship, while his teammate, Jamie Whincup, finished second. In 2008, Lowndes and Whincup won the Bathurst 1000 for a third time in a row, becoming only the third pairing in the history of the Bathurst 1000 to achieve it, after Peter Brock and Jim Richards (1978–80) and Peter Brock and Larry Perkins (1982–84).

2009

In 2009, Lowndes started the year with a brand new Ford FG Falcon. Despite winning races in Winton, the Gold Coast and Barbagallo, he was unable to match his teammate and finished the year 4th in the standings. Being once again paired up with Whincup in the enduros but suffered the heartbreak of losing the race lead on the final lap of the L&H Phillip Island 500 due to a delaminating tyre. Heading to Bathurst on the verge of making history, they failed in their bid to win a fourth consecutive Bathurst title, due to a drive-thru penalty and a clutch problem.

2010
In 2010, Team Vodafone switched to Holden Commodores as Ford cut sponsorship. Lowndes placed fourth in the championship with podiums in Abu Dhabi, Bahrain, Queensland Raceway and Winton. Partnering five-time champion Mark Skaife, Lowndes won the Bathurst 1000 for the fifth time, as well as the Phillip Island 500. His first solo victory for the season came during the Falken Tasmania Challenge at Symmons Plains.

2011-12

2011 was Lowndes' most competitive season in five years, narrowly finishing second in the championship to teammate Whincup. He achieved five pole positions, a clean sweep of the Queensland Raceway round, another Phillip Island 500 crown with Mark Skaife and second place at Bathurst. Lowndes finished off the year by winning the Sydney 500, and taking out the Barry Sheene Medal for the third time. He backed up his campaign in 2011 by again finishing second to Whincup the following season. 2012 saw Lowndes net seven race victories in the championship, including his fifth Sandown 500 title with teammate Warren Luff.

2013

In the 2013 season opener in Adelaide, Lowndes won by a record margin of over 20.5 seconds in Race 1, while coming in third in Race 2. Lowndes' race 1 victory marked the first win under V8 Supercar's new "Car of the Future" regulations, as well as the 90th of his career, equalling all-time rival Mark Skaife. Along with his Triple Eight Racing teammate Jamie Whincup, Lowndes had continued to dominate in the 2013 season, scoring race wins at Adelaide, Barbagallo Raceway, Hidden Valley Raceway, and also winning Race 1 at Gold Coast with co-driver Warren Luff. He ended the season in 2nd for the third consecutive year, all behind Jamie Whincup.

2015

In 2015, Lowndes became the first driver to reach 100 race wins in the V8 Supercar championship. He capped off a brilliant campaign by placing second in the championship and winning his sixth Supercheap Auto Bathurst 1000 with Steven Richards. In doing so, he equalled all-time greats Mark Skaife and Larry Perkins in terms of number of victories at Mount Panorama, and now stands alone with a record 13th podium at the event. He also scored his 5th Barry Sheene Medal and won the Most Popular Driver award for the third year in succession (since its inception in 2013).

2016

In 2016, Lowndes rejoined long-time Triple Eight Race Engineering technical director Ludo Lacroix as his Engineer under Team Vortex livery Lowndes won his first race of the year at the Perth SuperSprint, where he charged through the field after taking on a two-stop strategy. At the Sydney SuperSprint, Lowndes became the first driver to enter 600 championship races, and after leading the first half of the race, finished second to Whincup, who in the process became the second driver after Lowndes to win 100 races.

2017
2017 saw the continuation of Team Vortex running alongside the newly named Red Bull Holden Racing Team. Despite race wins from both reigning champion Van Gisbergen and crowned champion Whincup, Lowndes for the first time in his career suffered a winless season and also was unable to record a podium finish. Despite the tough season and disappointing outcome of 10th in the championship (his lowest since 2004 and lowest ever with Triple Eight), Lowndes denied retirement and announced his intention to continue racing in 2018.

2018
In January, Lowndes peeled back the covers of the Autobarn Lowndes Racing Holden ZB Commodore in which he would compete in 2018, and also confirmed he would once again be partnered by Steven Richards in the Pirtek Enduro Cup. At Tasmania, Lowndes took his first victory in nearly two years, recording the 106th win of his career in the second leg of the 2018 Tasmania SuperSprint. On 5 July, during the press conference at the Townsville 400, Lowndes announced that he will retire from full-time competition at the end of the 2018 championship. He will remain with Triple Eight Race Engineering as an endurance driver.

On 7 October 2018, Lowndes won his 7th Bathurst 1000 in a record time of 6 hours 1 minute with co-driver Steven Richards. The win equals Steven's father Jim Richards' total of 7 wins. Lowndes and Richards won the Pirtek Enduro Cup award after a strong showing throughout the campaign, including podiums at Sandown and the Gold Coast alongside his Bathurst win. Lowndes is the second driver to win the cup more than once.

Off-road racing
In 2010, Lowndes ventured off-road to compete in the Australasian Safari with a Holden Colorado at his disposal. He won the Rally Raid at his first attempt with a margin of over one hour back to second place. Former V8 Supercar team owner, Kees Weel was co-driver. Lowndes crashed out of the lead of the Safari the following year.

Bathurst 12 Hour

Lowndes' first competitive race at Bathurst was in the 1994 James Hardie 12 Hour for production cars. Sharing a Nissan Pulsar SSS with John and Phil Morriss, Lowndes finished 14th outright and first in Class B.

Since the Bathurst 12 Hour race was changed to allow FIA GT3 cars in 2011, Lowndes has been a regular competitor in the race. In 2011 he finished second outright in an Audi R8 LMS GT3 driving for famed German endurance racing team and multiple 24 Hours of Le Mans winners Joest Racing. In 2012 he failed to finish, again driving an Audi R8, this time for another German team Phoenix Racing, while he also failed to finish in 2013, again in an R8.

Lowndes finally won the race in 2014 driving a Ferrari 458 GT3 for Maranello Motorsport alongside fellow Aussies John Bowe and Peter Edwards, and ex-Formula One driver, Mika Salo of Finland.

On 5 February 2017, Lowndes again drove for Maranello Motorsport to win the 2017 Liqui Moly Bathurst 12 Hour in a Ferrari 488 GT3 alongside Triple Eight teammate Jamie Whincup and another Finnish driver Toni Vilander.

Racing record

Career summary

Supercars Championship results

Bathurst 1000 results

Complete International Formula 3000 results
(key) (Races in bold indicate pole position) (Races in italics indicate fastest lap)

Complete Bathurst 12 Hour results

Personal life

Lowndes and wife Lara were married in 2015. They reside in Brisbane, Queensland.

He has two children, Levi and Chilli.

In 2011, Lowndes confirmed his amicable separation from his previous marriage.

References

External links

Craig Lowndes Official Web Site
Craig Lowndes Story (1999)

1974 births
Living people
Australian rally drivers
Australian Touring Car Championship drivers
Bathurst 1000 winners
Blancpain Endurance Series drivers
Formula Ford drivers
Formula Holden drivers
International Formula 3000 drivers
Racing drivers from Melbourne
Recipients of the Medal of the Order of Australia
Supercars Championship drivers
24 Hours of Spa drivers
Mercedes-AMG Motorsport drivers
RSM Marko drivers
Porsche Motorsports drivers
Phoenix Racing drivers
Team Joest drivers
AF Corse drivers
McLaren Racing drivers